"Black Balloon" is the fifth and final single by indie rock duo The Kills from their third studio album, Midnight Boom (2008). It was released on March 22, 2009 through the independent label Domino. The single features two acoustic B-sides, "Weedkiller", and a cover of the blues standard "Forty Four", originally written by Roosevelt Sykes.

"Black Balloon" is a "relatively docile" song, using the black balloon as a metaphor to "signify loss and the need to move on." A music video for the song was directed by Kenneth Capello. In February 2011, "Black Balloon" was featured in an episode of the American TV series, The Good Wife. In 2014, "Black Balloon" was also featured in the movie "Asthma (film)".

Track listing

Charts

References

2009 singles
The Kills songs
Domino Recording Company singles
2008 songs